Knucklebones is a 1971 Iranian film directed by Zakaria Hashemi. It stars Naser Malek Motiee, Bahman Mofid, Shahrzad, and Morvarid.

Cast

References

External links
Se-ghap in Internet Movie Database

Iranian drama films
1970s Persian-language films
1971 films
Iranian black-and-white films